Bill Gray is a former American football and tennis coach. He served as the full-time head football coach at Samford University from 2002 to 2006, after being named the interim head coach midway through the 2001 season.

Gray is a 1991 graduate of Mississippi College, where was the head tennis coach in the early 1990s.

Head coaching record

Football

Notes

References

Year of birth missing (living people)
Living people
Samford Bulldogs football coaches
Mississippi College alumni
College tennis coaches in the United States